Dmitry Anatolyevich Gorkov (born 24 October 1964) is a Russian professional football coach and a former player.

Club career
He made his professional debut in the Soviet First League in 1984 for FC Lokomotiv Moscow. He played 2 games in the UEFA Cup 1993–94 for FC Lokomotiv Moscow.

Honours
 Soviet Cup finalist: 1990.
 Russian Premier League bronze: 1994.

References

1964 births
Footballers from Moscow
Living people
Soviet footballers
Russian footballers
Russian football managers
FC Lokomotiv Moscow players
Russian Premier League players
FC Asmaral Moscow managers
Étoile Sportive du Sahel players
Association football midfielders
Russian expatriate footballers
Expatriate footballers in Tunisia
Russian expatriate sportspeople in Tunisia
FC FShM Torpedo Moscow players